Antero Sosa Soriano (January 3, 1888 – June 15, 1929) was a Filipino congressman, senator, and governor of Cavite from Tanza, Cavite.

Early life
Antero Soriano was born in Tanza, province of Cavite to Adriano Soriano and Aurea Sosa on January 3, 1886. He studied in Liceo de Manila, graduating and receiving his degree of Bachelor of Arts in 1904. He studied law in the famous Escuela de Derecho (now Manila Law College Foundation) in Manila until September 1907, when he presented himself for examination with one hundred other students before an examining tribunal nominated by the Supreme Court of the Philippines. Only five applicants passed and Soriano was one of them. He started practicing law immediately. He then became the lawyer of the Manila Railroad Company.

Political career
In June 1912, Soriano was elected governor of the province of Cavite at the age of 26. He was then re-elected in 1916. He was elected senator from the 5th District for two terms in 1919 and in 1922. He was the chairman of the committee on the Manila Railroad, chairman of the special committee on distribution of public work funds, and a member of the Senate committee on Agricultural and Natural Resources. He is also a member of a special committee appointed to investigate the alleged "land trust" in the Philippines.

He was appointed member of the Philippine Parliamentary Mission, and upon arrival in the United States, was made Chairman of a committee to investigate the Philippine Press Bureau at Washington, and recommended its continuance.

On August 15, 1925, Soriano was elected as a representative of the at-large district of Cavite through a special election. He filled the vacancy created by the death of Rep. Augusto Reyes on July 3, days before the opening of the 7th Philippine Legislature. He was then re-elected to a fresh full term in 1928.

Death
Soriano died in office on June 15, 1929, at the age of 41 due to appendicitis. His remains lie in the old cemetery in Tanza, Cavite.

Personal life
On December 5, 1907, Soriano married Gerarda Aquino but was widowed on July 12, 1914. He then remarried with Maximina Salud. His children are Arturo, Julia, Josefina, Milagros, Benjamin, Reynaldo, Adriano, Gerarda, Amelia, Asuncion, and Celia.

Legacy
The Antero Soriano Highway, the road on the northwestern coast of Cavite, was named after him in accordance with Republic Act 5782 enacted on July 21, 1969.

References

1880s births
1929 deaths
People from Tanza, Cavite
Governors of Cavite
Senators of the 6th Philippine Legislature
Senators of the 5th Philippine Legislature
Members of the House of Representatives of the Philippines from Cavite